The Office Pass (TOP) is a neighborhood co-working tech platform and operator, headquartered in Gurgaon, India, that connects companies and professionals with office space located near them.

History
The Office Pass (TOP) was founded in March 2017 by Aditya Verma, Nikhil Madan, and Sachin Gaur. The company was started by Aditya Verma who was a co-founder and former CEO of Makaan.com, a property portal which was acquired by PropTiger in 2015 and then Verma left the company in December 2016.

In August 2021, The Office Pass has 9 operational Neighborhood Coworking offices across Delhi NCR.

Locations
The Office Pass (TOP) has 7 offices in Gurgaon location. They have biggest office in Noida sector 4. Recently they have opened their new office in Golf Course Road, Near Sector 53-54 metro station, Gurgaon.

Gurgaon 
 Cyber City, DLF Phase 3, Gurgaon
 Unitech Cyber Park, Sec 39
 JMD Megapolis, Sohna Road
 Vipul Trade Centre, Sohna Road
 DLF Corporate Greens - New Gurgaon
 Paras Downtown, Golf Course Road
Vatika Towers, Golf Course Road

Noida 
 Sector - 4, Near Noida Sector 16 metro station

Delhi 
 Mohan Cooperative, Near Mohan Estate metro station, South Delhi

Funding
In April 2017, The Office Pass has received a funding of $245,000 (Rs 1.5 crore) in seed investment by Arun Tadanki, former managing director of Yahoo India and Southeast Asia and from other groups of investors.

In November 2017, The Office Pass has raised an undisclosed funding by Dhruv Agarwala, the chief executive and founder of PropTiger, Housing.com and other individual investors have also participated in the round.

Recognition
 2018: Recognized as the top 100 start-ups by Sutra HR.

See also 
 Regus
 WeWork
 Awfis

References

External links 
 Official website

Companies based in Gurgaon
Coworking space providers
Real estate companies established in 2017
Indian companies established in 2017
2017 establishments in Haryana